Piotr Juszczak (born 3 July 1988) is a Polish rower. He competed in the Men's eight event at the 2012 and 2016 Summer Olympics.

References

1988 births
Living people
Olympic rowers of Poland
Polish male rowers
Rowers at the 2012 Summer Olympics
Rowers at the 2016 Summer Olympics
Sportspeople from Kalisz
World Rowing Championships medalists for Poland
European Rowing Championships medalists
21st-century Polish people